Anne Elizabeth Urquhart (born 18 October 1957) is an Australian politician. She is a member of the Australian Labor Party (ALP) and has served as a Senator for Tasmania since 2011. She was a senior official with the Australian Manufacturing Workers' Union (AMWU) prior to entering politics.

Early life
Urquhart was born in Latrobe, Tasmania, the second of three children born to Tom and Betty Polden. After starting a family with her husband Graham, in July 1980 she began working as a process worker at the Edgell-Birds Eye factory in Ulverstone, which was later taken over by Simplot Australia.

Urquhart joined the Food Preservers' Union of Australia, initially serving as a delegate and then from August 1990 as a full-time organiser. Her union was later merged into the Australian Manufacturing Workers' Union (AMWU), and she served as state president from 1998 to 2004 and state secretary from 2004 to 2010.

Politics
Urquhart served as a vice-president of the Australian Labor Party (Tasmanian Branch) from 2004 and as a delegate to the ALP National Conference. She was elected to the Senate at the 2010 federal election, and re-elected to a second term in 2016. Her office is located in Devonport.

In 2014 Urquhart was elected state president of the ALP, replacing Rebecca White. She has served on a variety of committees during her time in the Senate. She has been the Labor Party's chief whip in the Senate since 2016, having previously served as a deputy whip from 2013 to 2016. After the ALP's victory at the 2022 federal election she became chief government whip.

References

External links
 
 Summary of parliamentary voting for Senator Anne Urquhart on TheyVoteForYou.org.au

1957 births
Living people
Australian Labor Party members of the Parliament of Australia
Labor Left politicians
Members of the Australian Senate
Members of the Australian Senate for Tasmania
Women members of the Australian Senate
Australian trade unionists
People from Latrobe, Tasmania
21st-century Australian politicians
21st-century Australian women politicians